Annexin A6 is a protein that in humans is encoded by the ANXA6 gene.

Function 

Annexin VI belongs to a family of calcium-dependent membrane and phospholipid binding proteins. Although their functions are still not clearly defined, several members of the annexin family have been implicated in membrane-related events along exocytotic and endocytotic pathways. The annexin VI gene is approximately 60 kbp long and contains 26 exons.  It encodes a protein of about 68 kDa that consists of eight 68-amino acid repeats separated by linking sequences of variable lengths. It is highly similar to human annexins I and II sequences, each of which contain four such repeats.  Exon 21 of annexin VI is alternatively spliced, giving rise to two isoforms that differ by a 6-amino acid insertion at the start of the seventh repeat.  Annexin VI has been implicated in mediating the endosome aggregation and vesicle fusion in secreting epithelia during exocytosis.

Model organisms

Model organisms have been used in the study of ANXA6 function. A conditional knockout mouse line, called Anxa6tm1a(EUCOMM)Wtsi was generated as part of the International Knockout Mouse Consortium program — a high-throughput mutagenesis project to generate and distribute animal models of disease to interested scientists — at the Wellcome Trust Sanger Institute.

Male and female animals underwent a standardized phenotypic screen to determine the effects of deletion. Twenty six tests were carried out on mutant mice and one significant abnormality was observed: female homozygous mutant animals had an increased susceptibility to Citrobacter infection.

Interactions 

ANXA6 has been shown to interact with RAS p21 protein activator 1.

References

Further reading

External links
 

Genes mutated in mice